Beth Herr and Penny Barg defeated Barbara Gerken and Gretchen Rush in the final, 6–1, 6–4 to win the inaugural Girls' Doubles tennis title at the 1982 Wimbledon Championships.

Seeds

  Elizabeth Minter /  Bernadette Randall (semifinals)
  Penny Barg /  Beth Herr (champions)
  Barbara Gerken /  Gretchen Rush (final)
  Etsuko Inoue /  Emiko Okagawa (quarterfinals)

Draw

Draw

References

External links

Girls' Doubles
Wimbledon Championship by year – Girls' doubles